HMS Hind was a modified Black Swan-class sloop of the Royal Navy. She was laid down by William Denny and Brothers, Dumbarton on 31 August 1942, launched on 30 September 1943 and commissioned on 11 April 1944, with the pennant number U39.

References

Further reading 
 
 
 
 
 

 

Black Swan-class sloops
World War II sloops of the United Kingdom
Sloops of the United Kingdom
Ships built on the River Clyde
1943 ships